In Borrowed Plumes is a 1926 American silent drama film directed by Victor Halperin and starring Marjorie Daw, Niles Welch and Wheeler Oakman.

Cast
 Marjorie Daw as Mildred Grantley / Countess D'Autreval 
 Niles Welch as Philip Dean 
 Wheeler Oakman as Jack Raymond 
 Louise Carter as Clara Raymond 
 Arnold Daly as Sam Wassup 
 Peggy Kelly as Mrs. Harrison 
 Dagmar Godowsky as Clarice

References

Bibliography
 Munden, Kenneth White. The American Film Institute Catalog of Motion Pictures Produced in the United States, Part 1. University of California Press, 1997.

External links

1926 films
1926 drama films
Silent American drama films
Films directed by Victor Halperin
American silent feature films
1920s English-language films
American black-and-white films
Arrow Film Corporation films
1920s American films